Banayudham (Bana's Battle) is an Aattakatha (Kathakali play) written by Balakavi Rama Shasthri. It used to be a popular play in the southern (thekkan) style of Kathakali. The Asura king Bana, son of Mahabali, has a thousand arms. His daughter Usha falls in love with Aniruddha, the grandson of Krishna. Bana discovers them together and imprisons Aniruddha. Krishna challenges Bana to a battle, in which he defeats Bana by chopping off all but four of his arms. An excerpt from the play, depicting scenes involving Usha and her friend Chitralekha, is often presented independently.

References

Kathakali
Indian plays
Malayalam-language literature